Prinoth is an Italian manufacturer of snow groomers and tracked utility vehicles. The company's headquarters are located in Sterzing, South Tyrol, Italy.

With its fleet of snow groomers, Prinoth is active in slope preparation. Its utility vehicles are used as carrier vehicles and for vegetation and biomass management.

History 
In 1951, Prinoth was founded when racing driver Ernesto Prinoth opened the predecessor of the current company, a garage. Fascinated by snow vehicles applied his passion for high-performance vehicles to the development of slope vehicles.

In 1962, produced his first P 60 prototype. Two years later, the first production vehicle rolled off the assembly line and developments continued over the years.

In 2000,  Prinoth was acquired by Leitner Group and continued the range as an independent company, becoming the world's most complete provider of snowcats.

In November 2005, Prinoth acquired the design, engineering, R&D, service, parts and sales operations for the groomer range of Canadian manufacturer Camoplast's (previously Bombardier Inc) industrial vehicles division with Camoplast handling the manufacturing.

In February 2009, Prinoth acquired the remaining development, design, production, sales and service operation of Camoplast's industrial vehicles division giving Prinoth a wider area of activity beyond snow groomers. With additional equipment of all types, thanks to their tracks, the robust vehicles are able to reach the most remote locations without sinking into mud or soft soil, unlike wheeled vehicles.

In 2011, Prinoth acquired German forestry machinery manufacturer, AHWI.

Products 
 Snow groomers
 Tracked Utility Vehicles
 Vegetation Management

References

External links 

 Prinoth Website

Manufacturing companies based in South Tyrol